Abdul Majeed Merza was a Ceylonese Muslim businessman and politician.

Merza ran as an Independent at the 2nd parliamentary election, held between 24 May 1952 and 30 May 1952, in the Kalmunai electorate. He won the seat, polling 6,078 votes (43% of the total vote), defeating the sitting United National Party member, M. S. Kariapper by 3,908 votes.

Merza didn't contest his seat at the 1956 parliamentary election and was appointed to the board of the Valaichchenai Paper Corporation, where he subsequently became the corporation's chairman for a number of years.

References

Date of birth missing
Date of death missing
Alumni of Zahira College, Colombo
Members of the 2nd Parliament of Ceylon
Sri Lankan Muslims
Sri Lankan businesspeople